Founded June 2, 1890 as a Select Committee, the Committee to Establish a University of the United States was an initiative of the United States Senate which became a Standing Committee on March 19, 1896. During this time there was also a National University Committee outside of the Senate.

In 1897 the committee tried to pass a bill to create a University of the United States, and three years later it presented a bill to allow the Smithsonian Institution to give out degrees. Neither bill was successful. The committee was disbanded in 1921 as part of a "housecleaning" that got rid of several largely inactive or defunct committees which still officially existed.

Chairmen of the Select Committee
George F. Edmunds (1890–1891)
Redfield Proctor (1891–1893)
Eppa Hunton (1893–1895)
James Kyle (1895–1897)

Chairmen of the Standing Committee
George L. Wellington (1897–1901)
William Joseph Deboe (1901–1903)
Chester Long (1903–1905)
James A. Hemenway (1905–1909)
Simon Guggenheim (1909–1911)
Joseph F. Johnston (1911–1913)
William Paul Dillingham (1913–1919)
John Sharp Williams (1919–1921)

Establish a University of the United States
1890 establishments in the United States
1921 disestablishments
Smithsonian Institution